Wan Hydro Electric project is situated near village Wari of Telhara Taluka in Akola District. This project envisages power generation utilizing/availing irrigation releases for about 333 days means 11 months. The power house with installed Capacity of one unit of 1.5 MW (1x1.5 MW) is installed as surface power house at the foot of the Wan Dam. The annual generation is 4.174 Mus. This project is administratively approved by Government of Maharashtra vide Irrigation Department's Resolution No. HBP 1094/(202/94) H P Mantralaya Mumbai dated 24/01/2000 for Rs.712.421 Lacks

Technical Information 
The main equipments are Turbine, Hydro Generator, Power and Control Cables, Power Transformer, Auxiliary Transformer, 110 V DC Equipments.

Turbine

Horizontal shaft Francis, type hydraulic turbine of rated output not less than 1650 kW at rated head of 33 m. and rated discharge of 7.33 cumecs with Governor and related auxiliary equipment such as oil pressure unit drainage and dewatering system, air compressor system, Nitrogen gas system, cooling water system.

Hydro Generator

Horizontal shaft synchronous generator of rating 2000 kVA, 3.3 kV, 3 phase, 50 Hz, 0.866 (lag) with exciter, AVR panel suitable to couple the turbine with other related auxiliary equipment complete with auxiliaries comprising fire extinguishing  and neutral end cubicles, brake system etc. complete

Power and Control Cables

3.3 kV, XLPE Power cable and 1.1 kV power and control cables of suitable sixes required for interconnecting all equipments and preparing cable schedule, supply and laying of cable racks/trays, supports, clamping etc. complete.

Power transformer

Power Transformer of rating 2000 kVA, 3-phase, 3.3 kV/11 kV, 50 Hz, ONAN outdoor type of 'OFF' load tap changer, terminal box suitable of power cable connections on L.T. side with first filling of oil and accessories etc. as per specification.

Auxiliary transformer

Auxiliary Transformer of 100 kVA, 3.3 kV/415 V. 3-phase, 50 Hz., indoor type Dyn-II with first filling of oil with auxiliaries

110 V DC equipments

Lead acid batteries 110 V, of suitable capacity with required accessories.
Battery charger suitable for 110 V, batteries with float and float cum boost charger with accessories.

References

Dams completed in 2000
Dams in Akola district
Dams on the Tapti River
Energy infrastructure completed in 2000
2000 establishments in Maharashtra